Bucalemu is a Chilean town, located  from Pichilemu, in the Cardenal Caro Province, O'Higgins Region. It belongs to the Paredones commune and, according to the 1992 census, Bucalemu has 1,532 inhabitants.

In Bucalemu's lagoon, it is common to find black-necked swans. Along its four kilometer beach, fishing of hakes and crabs (locally known as jaibas) drive the town's economy.

See also

 Feast of Saint Francis
 List of towns in Chile

Populated places in Cardenal Caro Province
Coasts of O'Higgins Region